Haxhi Neziraj (born 16 March 1993) is an Albanian professional footballer who plays as a attacking midfielder for SC Buochs.

Club career

Flamurtari Vlorë
On 30 January 2017. Neziraj joined Albanian Superliga side Flamurtari Vlorë. On 1 February 2017, he made his debut with Flamurtari Vlorë in the fourth round of 2016–17 Albanian Cup against Besëlidhja Lezhë after coming on as a substitute at 29th minute in place of injured Ardit Shehaj.

Drita
On 31 January 2018. Neziraj signed to Football Superleague of Kosovo side Drita. On 14 February 2018, he made his debut with Drita in the quarter-finals of 2017–18 Kosovar Cup against Istogu and scoring his side's only goal during a 0–1 away win.

International career
On 7 June 2013. Neziraj made his debut with Albania U21 in a 2015 UEFA European Under-21 Championship qualification match against Hungary U21 after being named in the starting line-up.

Personal life
Neziraj was born in Lucerne, Switzerland from Kosovo Albanian parents from Gjakova.

References

External links

1993 births
Living people
Sportspeople from Lucerne
Kosovo Albanians
Kosovan people of Albanian descent
Association football midfielders
Albanian footballers
Albania under-21 international footballers
Swiss Super League players
FC Luzern players
Swiss Challenge League players
FC Wohlen players
FC Schaffhausen players
Kategoria Superiore players
Flamurtari Vlorë players
FC Drita players
KF Feronikeli players
Football Superleague of Kosovo players
Albanian expatriate footballers
Expatriate footballers in Kosovo
Albanian expatriate sportspeople in Kosovo